The arrondissement of Le Blanc is an arrondissement of France in the Indre department in the Centre-Val de Loire region. It has 57 communes.

Composition

The communes of the arrondissement of Le Blanc, and their INSEE codes, are:

 Azay-le-Ferron (36010)
 Beaulieu (36015)
 Bélâbre (36016)
 Le Blanc (36018)
 Bonneuil (36020)
 Chaillac (36035)
 Chalais (36036)
 La Châtre-Langlin (36047)
 Chazelet (36049)
 Chitray (36051)
 Ciron (36053)
 Concremiers (36058)
 Douadic (36066)
 Dunet (36067)
 Fontgombault (36076)
 Ingrandes (36087)
 Lignac (36094)
 Lingé (36096)
 Lurais (36104)
 Lureuil (36105)
 Luzeret (36106)
 Martizay (36113)
 Mauvières (36114)
 Mérigny (36119)
 Mézières-en-Brenne (36123)
 Migné (36124)
 Mouhet (36134)
 Néons-sur-Creuse (36137)
 Nuret-le-Ferron (36144)
 Obterre (36145)
 Oulches (36148)
 Parnac (36150)
 Paulnay (36153)
 La Pérouille (36157)
 Pouligny-Saint-Pierre (36165)
 Preuilly-la-Ville (36167)
 Prissac (36168)
 Rivarennes (36172)
 Rosnay (36173)
 Roussines (36174)
 Ruffec (36176)
 Sacierges-Saint-Martin (36177)
 Saint-Aigny (36178)
 Saint-Benoît-du-Sault (36182)
 Saint-Civran (36187)
 Sainte-Gemme (36193)
 Saint-Gaultier (36192)
 Saint-Gilles (36196)
 Saint-Hilaire-sur-Benaize (36197)
 Saint-Michel-en-Brenne (36204)
 Saulnay (36212)
 Sauzelles (36213)
 Thenay (36220)
 Tilly (36223)
 Tournon-Saint-Martin (36224)
 Vigoux (36239)
 Villiers (36246)

History

The arrondissement of Le Blanc was created in 1800. At the January 2017 reorganisation of the arrondissements of Indre, it gained the commune La Pérouille from the arrondissement of Châteauroux.

As a result of the reorganisation of the cantons of France which came into effect in 2015, the borders of the cantons are no longer related to the borders of the arrondissements. The cantons of the arrondissement of Le Blanc were, as of January 2015:

 Bélâbre
 Le Blanc
 Mézières-en-Brenne
 Saint-Benoît-du-Sault
 Saint-Gaultier
 Tournon-Saint-Martin

References

Le Blanc